The San Diego Mariners were an ice hockey team based in San Diego that played in the World Hockey Association from 1974 to 1977 at the San Diego Sports Arena. Previous to being in San Diego, the team was known as the New York Raiders, New York Golden Blades, and Jersey Knights. After folding in 1977, San Diego Mariners' name was adopted by an unrelated franchise in the low-level, minor professional Pacific Hockey League (PHL).

Notable alumni
Star players for the Mariners included defenseman Harry Howell, center Andre Lacroix, and goaltender Ernie Wakely. The Mariners were coached by Howell (as player-coach) during their first season and Ron Ingram the succeeding two seasons, qualifying for the WHA playoffs each year.

Demise
During the Mariners' final WHA season, the team was owned by San Diego Padres and McDonald's owner Ray Kroc.  The team never drew well, and when they only managed to attract 5,000 fans per game, Kroc sold the team to a group who planned to move it to Melbourne, Florida, however, they could not find a suitable arena. The team was then sold to former Philadelphia Flyers minority owner Bill Putnam, who changed the team's name to the "Florida Breakers" and announced they would play at the Hollywood Sportatorium in Hollywood, Florida, between Miami and Fort Lauderdale. After this deal fell apart Jerry Saperstein tried to buy the team and move them to the same area as the Florida Icegators. However, this deal collapsed as well, and after three attempts by three different groups to move the team to Florida all failed, the Mariners folded just before training camp opened in the fall of 1977.  Fans who put down deposits for season tickets never got their money back. The last Mariners player active in major professional hockey was Kevin Devine, who played his last NHL game in the 1982-83 NHL season. Ron Plumb was the last active player who retired in 1986 after in England. Mariners' draft pick Don Edwards played in the NHL until 1986, but never played in the WHA.

Team colors
Team colors for the Mariners were orange and blue. The uniforms were the same design as the team wore as the New York Raiders and Jersey Knights, albeit with the jersey logo replaced with San Diego spelled out diagonally across the front. The color scheme was the same as it was for the San Diego Gulls of the old Western Hockey League. The color scheme was later adopted in the form of throwback jerseys for the now-defunct WCHL/ECHL San Diego Gulls.

Season-by-season record
Note: GP = Games played, W = Wins, L = Losses, T = Ties, Pts = Points, GF = Goals for, GA = Goals against, PIM = Penalties in minutes

Name reused in new league
After the WHA Mariners folded, San Diego Arena operator Peter Graham joined the idea for a new low-level minor professional hockey league on the West Coast, the Pacific Hockey League (PHL). Graham used the name of the defunct WHA team, founding an unrelated San Diego Mariners in the PHL in 1977. Those Mariners were sold in 1978 to Pittsburgh businessman Elmer Jonnet, and played in the PHL's second and final season as the "San Diego Hawks".

See also
List of San Diego Mariners (WHA) players

References

External links
 WHAhockey.com - San Diego Mariners

 
World Hockey Association teams
Ice hockey clubs established in 1974
Ice hockey clubs disestablished in 1977
Ice hockey teams in San Diego
Defunct ice hockey teams in California
Raiders/Golden Blades/Knights WHA franchise